D.C. Sniper is a 2010 American direct-to-video drama-thriller film directed by Ulli Lommel and written by Lommel and Ken Foree. It stars Foree, Christopher Kriesa and Maria Ochoa.

Plot
The film tells over the Beltway sniper attacks, the crimes of John Allen Muhammad and Lee Malvo.

Cast

Reception
The film was released as direct-to-video project on March 16, 2010.

See also
 D.C. Sniper: 23 Days of Fear, a TV movie about the same subject

References

External links 
 
 "Project Terrible: D.C. Sniper", Robert Mohr, December 2, 2013

2010 films
2010 crime thriller films
2010 horror films
American crime thriller films
Thriller films based on actual events
Films set in Washington, D.C.
Films shot in Washington, D.C.
American serial killer films
Crime films based on actual events
Films directed by Ulli Lommel
Films scored by Robert J. Walsh
2010s English-language films
2010s American films